The Connor Hotel was a beaux arts style hotel at 324 Main Street in Joplin, Missouri. Built between 1906 and 1908, the structure is best known nationally because of its unexpected collapse in 1978 which killed two men.

Construction 
The Connor Hotel was the brainchild of Thomas Connor, an early 20th century Joplin, Missouri millionaire. Before the Connor Hotel was built, Connor owned the Joplin Hotel. The Joplin had 3 stories and about 50 rooms. It sat where the Connor hotel would later be built. Rumors went around that Connor would expand the Joplin Hotel. Instead, in 1906, Connor demolished the building to make a new hotel.

The new hotel's construction began immediately after demolition, and it was going to be called the Joplin Hotel, like its predecessor. However, in 1907, Connor died at the age of 60. When the new hotel opened in 1908, the new hotel was named the Connor Hotel, in memory of Thomas Connor.

Structural collapse
On November 11, 1978, one day before its scheduled demolition, the hotel collapsed with three workers inside it. Two of the men, Thomas Oaks and Frederick Coe, did not survive. The third, Alfred Sommers, was rescued 82 hours after the collapse.

References 

Demolished hotels in the United States
Historic hotels in the United States
Demolished buildings and structures in Missouri
Buildings and structures in Joplin, Missouri
National Register of Historic Places in Jasper County, Missouri
Buildings and structures demolished in 1978